Fredrich Kovacs is an American former soccer player who earned four caps with the U.S. national team in 1972 and 1973.

Kovacs gained his first cap in a World Cup qualifier on September 10, 1972. The U.S. lost, 2-1, to Mexico. Kovacs started the game, then came off in the 56th minute for Gary Rensing.  Kovacs then played three more full internationals in 1973. His last came in a 2-0 win over Canada on August 5, 1973.

Kovacs is also a longtime member of Schwaben Athletic Club of Chicago. He is a former Chicago Sting player.

References

External links

United States men's international soccer players
Chicago Schwaben players
Living people
American soccer players
Association footballers not categorized by position
Year of birth missing (living people)